Aminath Rouya Hussain (born September 1, 1990) is a competitive swimmer from the Maldives. She competed in the 2008 Summer Olympics in Beijing, China, and was the flag-bearer for her nation during the opening ceremonies of those games.

External links
 
 
 
 
 Aminath Rouya Hussain at NBC Olympics

Maldivian female swimmers
Olympic swimmers of the Maldives
Swimmers at the 2008 Summer Olympics
1990 births
Living people
Swimmers at the 2004 Summer Olympics